The Skycycle X-2 was a steam-powered rocket owned by Evel Knievel and flown during his Snake River Canyon jump in Idaho in 1974.

An earlier prototype was designed, named the Skycycle X-1, by Doug Malewicki and retired U.S. Navy engineer Robert Truax. It was tested in November 1973 and dove in the Snake River.

The parachute deployed during the launch, causing the stunt to fail.

A later analysis showed that a design flaw in a mechanical parachute retention cover, which did not properly take base drag into account, caused the premature parachute deployment.  Following the failed jump, Truax blamed Knievel for the failure and vice versa. Later, Truax accepted full responsibility for the failure.

The jump
Although the parachute deployed early, the aerial photographs show the X-2 cleared the canyon.  However, the winds blew the rocket back to launch side, crashing at the bottom of the canyon, barely missing the river.  Knievel stated that if the X-2 had landed in the water,  he would have drowned, as he did not have the ability to release himself from the harness.

In order to obtain permission from the State of Idaho to perform the canyon jump, the X-2 was registered as an airplane rather than a motorcycle.

Three Skycycle X-2s were built for Knievel.  The first two were used for test flights.  Unable to fund further tests, Knievel used the third for the canyon jump. In 2007, the Skycycle X-2-1 was offered for sale for $5 million.  The X-2-2 is owned by the Knievel estate and periodically exhibited along with a museum of Knievel artifacts.

In the era before cable networks, the Sunday afternoon jump was covered live by Top Rank on paid closed circuit television in several hundred theaters and arenas, promoted by Bob Arum with an average price of ten dollars. Taped coverage by ABC was shown on Wide World of Sports later in the month. The ticket price at the launch site was twenty-five dollars.

The jump was pushed out of the newspaper headlines by the pardon of Richard Nixon by President Gerald Ford.

Monument

The monument was dedicated in September 1985, at a small ceremony attended by Knievel.

Re-creation of the jump
Since the 1974 launch, seven daredevils have expressed interest in recreating the jump, including Knievel's two sons Robbie and Kelly.  Robbie announced he would recreate the jump in 2010.  Stuntman Eddie Braun worked with Kelly and Robert Truax's son to recreate the jump using a replica of the Skycycle X-2.  Braun successfully flew his rocket, named Evel Spirit, across the Snake River Canyon on September 16, 2016.

Audi commercial
On July 18, 2012, Audi of America recreated Knievel's Snake River jump in a promotional commercial for the Audi RS5.  The commercial depicts the RS5 being driven by a professional driver and jumping the canyon off a jump ramp.

See also

Video
Audi - Return to Snake River Canyon commercial
You Tube – Skycycle test and jump
You Tube – Skycycle X-2 jump
Smithsonian Channel – modern-day video of jump area

References

External links
Canosoarus.com – Skycycle X-1
Magic Valley.com – A leap into history
 Evel Knievel Snake River Canyon Jump Site – on Google Maps

Rockets and missiles